Chicla District is one of thirty-two districts of the Huarochirí Province, located in the Department of Lima in Peru. The district was created by the Law No. 11981 in March 4, 1953, during the presidency of Manuel A. Odría. It encompasses an area of 244.1 km2.

Geography 
Some of the highest mountains of the district are listed below:

See also 
 Tiktiqucha
 Yuraqmayu

References